Christopher Raphael Deluzio (born July 13, 1984) is an American attorney, politician and former U.S. Navy officer serving as the U.S. representative for Pennsylvania's 17th congressional district since 2023. The district includes most of the northwestern suburbs of Pittsburgh. He is a member of the Democratic Party.

Early life and education
Deluzio was born in Pittsburgh and raised in Thornburg, Pennsylvania. He attended Bishop Canevin High School and then the United States Naval Academy, where he earned a Bachelor of Science degree in 2006. He later graduated magna cum laude and received his juris doctor degree from the Georgetown University Law Center in 2013.

Early career 
After graduating from the Naval Academy, Deluzio deployed to Iraq as a naval officer from 2006 to 2012. He later worked as a litigation associate at Wachtell, Lipton, Rosen & Katz in New York City before being named a legal and policy scholar of the University of Pittsburgh Institute for Cyber Law, Policy, and Security.

U.S. House of Representatives

Elections

2022 

He won the general election with 53.4% of the vote, defeating Republican nominee Jeremy Shaffer.

Tenure

Caucus memberships
Congressional Progressive Caucus (deputy whip)

Committee assignments 

 Committee on Veterans Affairs
 Committee on Armed Services

Political positions

Labor
Deluzio is a labor advocate and supporter of the PRO Act, the federal bill expanding workers’ rights to organize a union and collectively bargain. He supports stronger anti-trust laws and enforcement to rein in corporate power and believes we should restore American supply chains and manufacturing.  During his 2022 campaign for Congress, Austin Ahlman of The American Prospect wrote that Deluzio has an "ardent belief" in "the power of labor politics".

Veterans
Deluzio advocates for expanding resources for the Department of  Veterans Affairs. He's said that lack of funding and staffing shortages have plagued the department, slowing claims processing and creating headaches for those who rely on VA health care benefits.

Abortion
Deluzio criticized the Supreme Court ruling overturning Roe v. Wade and has said, "women should have the freedom to make their own decisions about their families and their healthcare."

Healthcare
As a Bernie Sanders delegate to the 2020 Democratic National Convention. Deluzio has spoken in favor of Medicare for All.

Personal life
Deluzio is from Thornburg, Pennsylvania, the son of Vincent and Rita Deluzio. His father owns a healthcare management consulting firm. In 2015, he married Alexandra Zoë Bunnell, whom he met while attending law school at Georgetown.

References

External links
 Congressman Chris Deluzio  official U.S. House website
 Chris Deluzio for Congress

 

|-

1984 births
Democratic Party members of the United States House of Representatives from Pennsylvania
Georgetown University Law Center alumni
Living people
Pennsylvania Democrats
Politicians from Pittsburgh
United States Naval Academy alumni
University of Pittsburgh people